Anil Vasudeo Virkar is an American materials scientist and engineer, currently Distinguished Professor at University of Utah. He is a Fellow of the ASM International.

Publications

References

Year of birth missing (living people)
Living people
University of Utah faculty
American materials scientists
21st-century American engineers
Members of the United States National Academy of Engineering